Skirlaugh is a village and civil parish in the East Riding of Yorkshire, England, in an area known as Holderness. Originally a farming community, it is now primarily a commuter village for Hull.

According to the 2011 UK census, Skirlaugh parish had a population of 1,473, a decrease on the 2001 UK census figure of 1,543.

The parish church, St Augustine's Church, was built by Walter de Skirlaw who later became the Bishop of Durham in the late 14th century. It is, according to Pevsner, a "gem of the early-perpendicular" style.
This is because subsequent generations left the original structure largely intact. The stonework was re-pointed in the 1980s and 1990s by Edward Brown, a local volunteer. The church is a Local Ecumenical Partnership between the Church of England and the Methodist church. In 1966 the church was designated a Grade I listed building and is now recorded in the National Heritage List for England, maintained by Historic England.

Skirlaugh rugby league club, play in the Premier Division of the National Conference League.

Notable people
Walter de Skirlaw (?–1406), Bishop of Durham and adviser to King Richard II and Henry IV
John Bigland (1750–1832), schoolmaster and historian

References

External links

Skirlaugh Parish Council website

Villages in the East Riding of Yorkshire
Civil parishes in the East Riding of Yorkshire
Holderness